Ryan Clarke (born 17 June 1997) is an Australian rules footballer playing for the Sydney Swans in the Australian Football League (AFL).

Early career

Prior to being drafted he attended Melbourne Grammar School and was captain of their First XVIII football team. At TAC Cup level he played for the Eastern Ranges, Clarke was viewed as a prolific ball-winner who averaged 31 disposals a game. He was and also impressive while playing for Vic Metro in the NAB AFL Under 18 Championships.

AFL career
He was drafted by the North Melbourne Football Club with their second selection and thirty-first overall in the 2015 national draft.  He made his debut in the thirty-two point loss against  in round 16, 2016 at Domain Stadium. He was rewarded with the round nomination for the Rising Star in the round 18, forty-point win against the Collingwood Football Club at Etihad Stadium where he recorded twenty-seven disposals, twelve contested possessions, four inside-50s and three goal assists. At the conclusion of the 2018 season, Clarke was traded to the Sydney Swans.

Family
Clarke is the older brother of Essendon's Dylan Clarke.

Statistics
Updated to the end of the 2022 season.

|-
| 2016 ||  || 13
| 6 || 0 || 4 || 35 || 70 || 105 || 12 || 13 || 0.0 || 0.7 || 5.8 || 11.7 || 17.5 || 2.0 || 2.2 || 0
|-
| 2017 ||  || 13
| 15 || 6 || 4 || 127 || 170 || 297 || 56 || 31 || 0.4 || 0.3 || 8.5 || 11.3 || 19.8 || 3.7 || 2.1 || 0
|-
| 2018 ||  || 13
| 19 || 2 || 3 || 207 || 168 || 375 || 82 || 32 || 0.1 || 0.2 || 10.9 || 8.8 || 19.7 || 4.3 || 1.7 || 0
|-
| 2019 ||  || 4
| 14 || 1 || 1 || 122 || 118 || 240 || 41 || 44 || 0.1 || 0.1 || 8.7 || 8.4 || 17.1 || 2.9 || 3.1 || 0
|-
| 2020 ||  || 4
| 10 || 2 || 1 || 86 || 79 || 165 || 25 || 25 || 0.2 || 0.1 || 8.6 || 7.9 || 16.5 || 2.5 || 2.5 || 1
|-
| 2021 ||  || 4
| 3 || 0 || 0 || 6 || 1 || 7 || 3 || 1 || 0.0 || 0.0 || 2.0 || 0.3 || 2.3 || 1.0 || 0.3 || 0
|-
| 2022 ||  || 4
| 14 || 5 || 4 || 54 || 75 || 129 || 21 || 40 || 0.4 || 0.3 || 3.9 || 5.4 || 9.2 || 1.5 || 2.9 || 0
|- class=sortbottom
! colspan=3 | Career
! 81 !! 16 !! 17 !! 637 !! 681 !! 1318 !! 240 !! 186 !! 0.2 !! 0.2 !! 7.9 !! 8.4 !! 16.3 !! 3.0 !! 2.3 !! 1
|}

Notes

Honours and achievements
Individual
 AFL Rising Star nominee: 2016 (round 18)

References

External links

1997 births
Living people
North Melbourne Football Club players
Eastern Ranges players
Australian rules footballers from Victoria (Australia)
Werribee Football Club players
Sydney Swans players
People educated at Melbourne Grammar School